Fraşerli may refer to:

Fraşerli Naim, or Naim Frashëri, Albanian poet and revivalist
Fraşerli Şemsettin Sami, or Sami Frashëri, Albanian writer, philosopher, playwright and revivalist
Fraşerli Gani Bey
Fraşerli Mehdî

See also
Frashëri

Turkish-language surnames